Sayfawa dynasty, Sefouwa, Sefawa, or Sefuwa dynasty is the name of the Muslim kings (or mai, as they called themselves) of the Kanem–Bornu Empire, centered first in Kanem in western Chad, and then, after 1380, in Borno (today north-eastern Nigeria).

The dynasty was rooted in the Tubu expansion by the Kanembu.

"The legendary eponymous ancestor of the Saifawa, as the Maghumi are called, only became in Muslim times Saif, the 'lion of Yaman.' The pre-Muslim dynasty is known as the Duguwa dynasty.

Sayfawa-Humewa kings in Kanem
The chronology of the Sefuwa concerns the rule of the Sayfawa dynasty first over Kanem, then over the Kanem–Bornu and finally, since c. 1380, over Bornu alone. The chronology of kings has been ascertained from dynastic records of the Sefuwa on the basis of lengths of reign for the successive kings (mai), found in the Girgam. African historians presently use several conflicting chronologies for the history of Kanem–Bornu. Below a list of the main kings of the Empire with the conflicting chronologies is provided.

List of rulers of the Sayfawa dynasty according to John Stewart's African States and Rulers (1989).

The Sayfawa dynasty ended in 1846 and was succeeded by a series of Sheikhs who ruled the Bornu empire until 1893.

See also
Bornu Empire
Kanem Empire
Othman I

References

Bibliography
 Barkindo, Bawuro (1985). "The early states of the Central Sudan", in: J. Ajayi and M. Crowder (eds.), The History of West Africa, vol. I, 3rd ed. Harlow, 225-254.
 Barth, Heinrich (1858). "Chronological table, containing a list of the Sefuwa", in: Travel and Discoveries in North and Central Africa. Vol. II, New York, 581-602.
 Lavers, John (1993). "Adventures in the chronology of the states of the Chad Basin". In: D. Barreteau and C. v. Graffenried (eds.), Datations et chronologies dans le Bassin du Lac Chad, Paris, 255-267.
 Levtzion, Nehemia (1978):"The Saharan and the Sudan from the Arab conquest of the Maghrib to the rise of the Almoravids", in: J. D. Fage (ed.), The Cambridge History of Africa, vol. II, Cambridge 1978, pp. 637–684.
 Nehemia Levtzion and John Hopkins (1981): Corpus of Early Arabic Sources for West African History, Cambridge.
 Palmer, Herbert Richmond (1936). Bornu Sahara and Sudan. London.
 Smith, Abdullahi (1971). The early states of the Central Sudan, in: J. Ajayi and M. Crowder (Hg.), History of West Africa. Vol. I, 1. Ausg., London, 158-183.

Urvoy, Yves (1941). "Chronologie du Bornou", Journal de la Société des Africanistes, 11, 21-31.

External links

 ; see also Encyclopædia Britannica, 4th ed., Chicago 1980, vol. 4, 572-582.
 

Countries in medieval Africa
Bornu Empire
Kanem Empire
Sunni dynasties